Yuki Asada (born 4 December 1965), better known by her stage name , is a Japanese actress and a former member of the Takarazuka Revue, where she specialized in playing male characters (Otokoyaku). She joined the revue in 1983 and resigned in 1997.

General information
Takane was born in Kyoto, Japan.  Having spent her entire Takarazuka career in Snow Troupe, she was the second regular star partner of legend Mari Hanafusa and is most remembered for two roles: Franz Joseph (the first of Takarazuka to be in this role) and Viscount Valmont of Kamen no Romanesque (The Takarazuka's adaptation of Dangerous Liaisons).

After she resigned from the company, she played Victoria Grant in Victor/Victoria in 1997. Her career is mostly focused on stage, but she also makes occasional TV appearances.

Notable roles and performance

Takarazuka era

Regular cast era
Valenteno　- Natacha Rambova
JFK - Robert F. Kennedy
Elisabeth - Franz Joseph
An Invitation from Alice - Jack/Ernest (Leading Performance at Bow Hall)

Top star era
Natasha of the Rainbow - Kaoru Sanjo
On a Clear Day You Can See Forever - Mark
Kamen no Romanesque - Count Valmont

After Takarazuka

Stage
Victor/Victoria - Victoria Grant
I Do! I Do! - Agnes
How to Succeed in Business Without Really Trying- Rosemary Pilkington
Love Letters -  Melissa Gardner

TV
The Golden Wings - Kinuko Hozhina

References 

Japanese actresses
1965 births
Living people
Takarazuka Revue
People from Kyoto
Cross-gender actresses